Edward G. Mazurs (1894–1983) was a chemist who wrote a history of the periodic system of the chemical elements which is still considered a "classic book on the history of the periodic table". Originally self-published as Types of graphic representation of the periodic system of chemical elements (1957), it was reviewed by the ACS in 1958 as "the most complete survey of the range of human imagination in representing graphically the Mendeleev periodic law."

A revised "centenary" edition covering a full 100 years of periodic tables was republished under the title Graphic Representations of the Periodic System During One Hundred Years  in 1974. Mazurs provided a comprehensive analysis and classification of periodic tables, listing and classifying over 700 periodic tables. He recommended Charles Janet's left-step system and suggested that it could be expanded into three dimensions.

Life and career
Mazurs was born in Latvia, then under Czarist rule. He earned a master's degree at the University of Riga (later the University of Latvia), teaching there after independence as a professor of chemistry, from 1919 to 1940.

Mazurs fled with his wife and son when Latvia was reoccupied by the Soviet Union in 1944 and spent years as a refugee, some of it in a refugee camp in Regensberg, Germany. He immigrated to America in 1949. After working at Argo Corn Products, he eventually obtained a professorship at Westmont College in Santa Barbara, California.

Publications

In a self-published book, Types of Graphic Representation of the Periodic System of the Elements (1957) he listed some 700 images published since 1862, classified under 146 heads. He brought out a greatly expanded version in 1974: Graphic Representations of the Periodic System during One Hundred Years. 

Mazurs' books are difficult to use because the references are divided into 146 corresponding sections, and the index refers to the types and not to pages. Nevertheless, his references are the most comprehensive and accurate ever compiled for the period covered.  He cited authors writing in at least 24 languages and from fifty countries. 

Working before the age of the photocopier, he copied his illustrations by hand and generally brought them up to date by adding elements missing from the original works, and sometimes he changed them radically. In this respect his work was unsatisfactory. He gave 67 references  to the modern standard medium long table, but paid it little attention, attributing its origin to Dmitri Mendeleev, who gave only a fragmentary description of it because he disliked interrupted series. Mazurs preferred tables based on electronic structure, notably that of  Charles Janet and his own modification of it.

Papers
His notes and papers are held in the library of the Science History Institute, 315 Chestnut Street, Philadelphia, Pennsylvania 19106, where they occupy 4 linear feet, and include lantern slides and transparencies of periodic tables which appear in his books.

Periodic tables

External links
 
Edward G. Mazurs Collection of Periodic Systems Images. Science History Institute Digital Collections. (87 high-resolution scans of models of the periodic table used by Edward G. Mazurs in Types of Graphic Representation of the Periodic System of Chemical Elements (1957).

References

1894 births
1983 deaths
Latvian chemists
People involved with the periodic table
Westmont College faculty
Academic staff of the University of Latvia